Sohr Damb ('Red Mound'), c. 3800–2300 BC, is an archaeological site, located near Nal, in central Balochistan, Pakistan that begins before the Indus Valley civilization featuring Togau, Kili Ghul Mohammad, and Kechi Beg pottery styles. It has also been known as 'Nal', and gave its name to the prehistoric Amri-Nal culture, which is attributed to the dual typesites of Amri and Nal.

The site extends around 4,5 hectares; the mound (mostly geologically formed) is 13 m high. The cultural stratum is less than 2 m deep. The excavations reveal four periods of occupation, and they could be further divided into several sub-periods.

Excavations
The locality was first discovered in 1903. In the following years, various minor excavations took place, including by Sir Aurel Stein. Since 2001, the site has been systematically excavated by the German Archaeological Institute and the Department of Archeology and Museums, Government of Pakistan.

Findings

Periodisation 

Amri-Nal culture: Based on the pottery found here, it is classified as a separate archaeological culture / subculture.

Period I 
The oldest period (Period I) belongs to the cultural complexes called Togau, Kili Ghul Mohammad, and Kechi Beg, but new research is needed to establish the exact sequence of them, and until now, 16 skeletons were found in 11 burials, some of them located in small chambers. The grave goods included ceramics, pearls, and semi-precious stones like carnelian, agate, lapis lazuli, also steatite beads, shells with red pigment and grinding stones. In Tomb 739/ 740, more than 12 bodies and 60 complete pots were found. All chambers contain multiple fractional burials, deposited some time after death. The pottery belongs to different cultural styles, such as Togau A–D, Kili Ghul Mohammad, and Kechi Beg, which were previously believed to represent development through time. The assemblage is comparable to Mehrgarh III–IV and Shahi Tump in Makran, but the differences in burial customs and grave goods are pronounced. Some parallels can also be drawn to the Sialk III horizon in Iran, so a date between 4000/3800 and 3200 BC is proposed.

Period II 
During Period II, we see the appearance of the Nal culture complex. The dead were now buried in individual graves. There are only a few vessels offered as grave goods. The excavated mud-brick houses are usually small. There was a lot of utility ceramics, but also some brightly painted ceramics typical of the Nal culture. There were also millstones, bone implements, and pearls. The settlement reached its present size of 4.5 ha. The Togau pottery, which was so common in Period I, was no longer produced and was replaced by the typical Nal pottery which is buff and carries complex geometric and figurative motifs painted in black, and often with turquoise, yellow, and red as additional colors. The calibrated dates are between 3100 BC and 2700 BC.

Period III 
Period III is closely related to the other cultures of the area, such as Mehrgarh, and Mundigak in Afghanistan. The mud-brick architecture has now become larger; copper makes its appearance, while the ceramics become simpler. Copper and ceramics were probably processed/produced on site. The calibrated results for Period III are from ca. 2700 to 2500/2400 BC, leaving no doubt that the terminal date of Period III is not much later than ca. 2400 BC. From this period onwards, and throughout the borderlands, Mundigak IV reached its largest size, Shahr-i Sokhta (II–III) grew into an urban center with monumental architecture, and in the Indus Valley, after 2600 BC, a centralized state took shape that gradually expanded over a huge area

Period IV 
The Period IV layers are badly eroded. Overall, this period belongs to the Kulli culture, as well as the Indus culture. Period IV occupation is very eroded and only attested at the surface, often just by gravel foundations. The pottery resembles so-called Kulli-Harappan types, and combines features of the indigenous Kulli complex with those of the Indus civilization and reflects the westerly expansion into the Kulli domain of this civilization, the calibrated dating results of the few samples available from Period IV fall to between 2500 and 2300 BC.

Agriculture

Domesticated cattle bones are plentiful in the settlement, and bull figurines are also found. The bones were identified as coming from humped or Zebu cattle.

Sheep and goats were also kept. The inhabitants also had dogs. Wild mammals account for only 5% of the bone remains.

The crops like wheat, and hulled and naked barley were used from the earliest period. Later, the crops indigenous to the Indian subcontinent, like sesame, and millet became more popular.

The sesame sample from Period III is the oldest, stratified record from this crop until now.

Both wild and cultivated fruits were exploited. Fig, jujube, dwarf palm and grape vine were quite popular.

Sohr Damb in context
Sohr Damb/Nal is stratigraphically earlier than the Kulli culture phase. Also, at Surab, Nal occupations are later than the Kili Gul Mohammad phase.

In the past, the Nal cemetery was understood as belonging to the Kulli Culture. But more recently, Nal is rather understood as belonging to its own pottery tradition, linked more to Baluchistan.

Sohr Damb ceramics, wheel-turned, and with polychrome decoration, shows some parallels with Mundigak period III1-6.

There's some controversy about the absolute chronological framework of the transition from Period II to III at Nal. This transition has a bearing on the chronology of both Shahr-e Sokhta, and of the Indus civilization. The transition can be dated either to the mid-3rd millennium, or to the late 3rd millennium BC.

Early Nal has an affinity with Amri, Sindh. Their pottery is quite similar.

Kulli-Mehi culture is in some ways a continuation of Nal.

See also

 Indus Valley civilization

 List of Indus Valley Civilization sites
 Bhirrana, 4 phases of IVC with earliest dated to 8th-7th millennium BCE
 Harappa
 Kalibanga, an IVC town and fort with several phases starting from Early harappan phase
 Kunal, Haryana pre harappan cultural ancestor of Rehman Dheri
 Mohenjo Daro
 Nindowari
 Rakhigarhi, one of the largest IVC city with 4 phases of IVC with earliest dated to 8th-7th millennium BCE

 List of inventions and discoveries of the Indus Valley Civilization
 Hydraulic engineering of the Indus Valley Civilization
 Sanitation of the Indus Valley civilisation

 Periodisation of the Indus Valley civilisation

 Pottery in the Indian subcontinent
 Bara culture, subtype of Late-Harappan Phase
 Black and red ware, belonging to neolithic and Pre-Harappan phases
 Kunal culture, subtype of Pre-Harappan Phase
 Sothi-Siswal culture, subtype of Pre-Harappan Phase
 Cemetery H culture (2000-1400 BC), early Indo-Aryan pottery at IVC sites later evolved into Painted Grey Ware culture of Vedic period

References

Citations

Bibliography

Paul Yule (2013), Silver Grave Goods from the Sohr Damb near Nal, Pakistan. Universität Heidelberg
Benecke N, Neef R. 2005. Faunal and plant remains from Sohr Damb/Nal: a prehistoric site (c. 3500–2000 BC) in central Balochistan (Pakistan). In: Franke-Vogt U, Weishaar J, editors. South Asian Archaeology 2003. Aachen: Linden Soft. p 81–91.
Jochen Görsdorf, Ute Franke-Vogt, IMPLICATION OF RADIOCARBON DATES FROM SOHR DAMB/NAL, BALOCHISTAN. RADIOCARBON, Vol 49, Nr 2, 2007, p 703-712
Hargreaves H. 1929. Excavations in Baluchistan 1925. Sampur Mound, Mastung and Sohr Damb, Nal. New Delhi: Memoirs of the Archaeological Survey of India 35.
Salvatori S, Tosi M. 2005. Shahr-e Sokhta revised sequence. In: Jarrige C, Lecomte O, editors. South Asian Archaeology 2001. Paris: ADPF Éditions Recherche sur les Civilisations. p 281–91.

External links
Archaeology of Ancient Balochistan - Slide show (including examples of 'Nal ware') - harappa.com

Pre-Indus Valley civilisation sites
Archaeological sites in Balochistan, Pakistan
Khuzdar District
Amri-Nal culture